The 2016 China Masters Grand Prix Gold is the seventh Grand Prix's badminton tournament of the 2016 BWF Grand Prix and Grand Prix Gold. The tournament was held at the Olympic Sports Center Xincheng Gymnasium in Changzhou, Jiangsu, China on 19–24 April 2016 and has a total purse of $150,000.

Men's singles

Seeds

  Chen Long (final)
  Lin Dan (champion)
  Srikanth Kidambi (first round)
  Wang Zhengming (first round)
  Son Wan-ho (first round)
  Kashyap Parupalli (withdrawn)
  H. S. Prannoy (quarterfinals)
  Lee Dong-keun (quarterfinals)
  Hsu Jen-hao (first round)
  Sho Sasaki (second round)
  Boonsak Ponsana (first round)
  Tanongsak Saensomboonsuk (semifinals)
  Sameer Verma (withdrawn)
  Zulfadli Zulkiffli (withdrawn)
  Iskandar Zulkarnain Zainuddin (third round)
  Wang Tzu-wei (first round)

Finals

Top half

Section 1

Section 2

Section 3

Section 4

Bottom half

Section 5

Section 6

Section 7

Section 8

Women's singles

Seeds

  Li Xuerui (champion)
  Saina Nehwal (withdrawn)
  Akane Yamaguchi (withdrawn)
  P.V. Sindhu (quarterfinals)
  Sun Yu (final)
  He Bingjiao (quarterfinals)
  Yui Hashimoto (first round)
  Bae Yeon-ju (quarterfinals)

Finals

Top half

Section 1

Section 2

Bottom half

Section 3

Section 4

Men's doubles

Seeds

  Lee Yong-dae / Yoo Yeon-seong (champion)
  Chai Biao / Hong Wei (withdrawn)
  Kim Gi-jung / Kim Sa-rang (final)
  Ko Sung-hyun / Shin Baek-cheol (quarterfinals)
  Liu Xiaolong / Qiu Zihan (second round)
  Lee Sheng-mu / Tsai Chia-hsin (withdrawn)
  Wang Yilyu / Zhang Wen (quarterfinals)
  Manu Attri / B. Sumeeth Reddy (first round)

Finals

Top half

Section 1

Section 2

Bottom half

Section 3

Section 4

Women's doubles

Seeds

  Luo Ying / Luo Yu (champion)
  Tian Qing / Zhao Yunlei (withdrawn)
  Jung Kyung-eun / Shin Seung-chan (first round)
  Chang Ye-na / Lee So-hee (quarterfinals)
  Tang Yuanting / Yu Yang (withdrawn)
  Naoko Fukuman / Kurumi Yonao (first round)
  Vivian Hoo Kah Mun / Woon Khe Wei (second round)
  Go Ah-ra / Yoo Hae-won (first round)

Finals

Top half

Section 1

Section 2

Bottom half

Section 3

Section 4

Mixed doubles

Seeds

  Xu Chen / Ma Jin (champion)
  Lee Chun Hei / Chau Hoi Wah (withdrawn)
  Shin Baek-cheol / Chae Yoo-jung (second round)
  Lu Kai / Huang Yaqiong (quarterfinals)
  Choi Sol-gyu / Eom Hye-won (first round)
  Chan Peng Soon / Goh Liu Ying (semifinals)
  Zheng Siwei / Chen Qingchen (final)
  Edi Subaktiar / Gloria Emanuelle Widjaja (first round)

Finals

Top half

Section 1

Section 2

Bottom half

Section 3

Section 4

References

External links 
 Tournament Link

China Masters
BWF Grand Prix Gold and Grand Prix
China Masters
China Masters
Sport in Jiangsu